Romsey Mill is a Christian charity dedicated to creating opportunities for change with young people, children and families in Cambridgeshire—including teenage parents, young people with autism, families with small children, and young people experiencing vulnerability or disadvantage.

Their programmes aim to develop social and personal skills, and to aid in education, training, work and relationships. The Step-Up programme provides alternative education to 14- to 16-year-olds who are struggling to remain within education, and the Young Parents Programme runs accredited courses each term.

The Romsey Mill Centre is located in the Romsey Town area of Cambridge and is used by a large number of groups run by the charity and by local community organisations. Following a major redevelopment, the building was dedicated by the Right Honourable and Most Reverend Dr John Sentamu, Archbishop of York in May 2007.

The charity was started in 1980 by five Cambridge churches under the inspiration and leadership of Rev Peter Phenna, who was then Vicar of St Martin's Church. These churches saw that young people and families in the area were often experiencing significant social needs, but that they were unlikely to walk into a church service. Romsey Mill began as a way of serving local young people and families.

Since 1980, the charity's work has grown so that in 2011 about 2600 young people and families used the centre during the year. The reach of its work now covers the whole of Cambridge and parts of South Cambridgeshire using community venues in these areas, such as the Soul Centre in Cambourne.

Romsey Mill became a Children's Centre in 2009 providing Sure Start services to families with pre-school children.

Romsey Mill's patrons are: Hugh Duberly CBE (HM Lord-Lieutenant of Cambridgeshire); Colin Greenhalgh CBE DL; Lady Wilson of Dinton.

External links
 Romsey Mill website
 Charity Commission - Romsey Mill Trust (Reg. Charity No. 1069905)

References
 
 

Buildings and structures in Cambridge
Organisations based in Cambridge
Youth organisations based in England
1980 establishments in England
Community centres in England
Charities based in Cambridgeshire